Hello! is a 2017 Indian Telugu-language romantic action film written and directed by Vikram K Kumar, and produced by Akkineni Nagarjuna under Annapurna Studios. The film stars Akhil Akkineni, Kalyani Priyadarshan, Jagapati Babu and Ramya Krishna. The music is composed by Anup Rubens. It was released on 22 December 2017.

Plot
Seenu is an orphaned street urchin, who used to play Violin and earn money in streets. He has a friend named Junnu. He makes a very close bonding with her. They always play with each other happily. But one day, Junnu's family moves to Delhi because of her father's transfer. When she leaves, Junnu gives her phone number to Seenu written on a  note, but a thief named Pandu steals that note. While chasing the thief to get the note, Seenu is hit by a car driven by Sarojini and her husband, Prakash. They later adopt Seenu after taking him to the hospital as Sarojini promised that she would do something good for the boy if he survived. After 14 years, Seenu, who is brought up as Avinash, along with Junnu alias Priya are both living affluent lifestyles but are not happy without each other. He finally discovers her whereabouts on a whim by hearing a tune they created during childhood while on a wrong call with a cab driver. 

The cab driver reveals that the location is a music fest, but a street thug (who is Pandu) steals his phone. So, he sets out to get it back to reconcile with Junnu. A flashback reveals that Avinash's journey with Sarojini and Prakash as a happy family.  Junnu is sad in Delhi thinking about Seenu and learns that her father is being transferred to the United States. Before leaving for United States, she thinks of finding Seenu in Hyderabad and attending her close friend's wedding. While picking up his mother at the airport, Avinash sees Priya but does not recognize her. Later Priya and Avinash meet again when Priya distributes 100 rupees to poor street children. They meet at the wedding but Priya reminded of Seenu, runs away. Avinash follows her and accidentally breaks the bangle, which was gifted by Seenu they were friends in childhood and were very dear to her. Being heartbroken, an enraged Priya slaps Avinash. 

Back to the present, Avinash retrieves his phone back from the phone mafia. He learns that Junnu is at the Hyderabad Music Festival. At the festival, he meets Priya, who is still upset about the fight they had at her friend's sangeet/wedding. They forgive each other, and Avinash gifts her a new bangle and wishes her all the best for her new life. Searching for Junnu, he goes to a music stall and starts playing the same tune they created during childhood. Junnu, hearing the song desperately runs searching for him but cannot find him. Avinash finds the  note with Junnu's phone number on it, and dials the number repeatedly, but she cuts the call repeatedly as she is also calling searching for the tune player's location in the fest. She finally picks up the call and speaks with him, but Avinash's mobile runs out of battery. He now knows that Junnu is also at the music festival. He visits the music stall again where Junnu had played earlier and plays one final time. Hearing the tune, Junnu runs around looking for the player. Stunned by seeing Junnu with a desperate look, Seenu murmurs, identifying Junnu followed by a sign of her saying yes, and they both embrace each other in love.

Cast

Soundtrack

Music of the movie was composed by Anup Rubens. Music released on Aditya Music. The audio function was held at Visakhapatnam on 7 December 2017. The film is Anup Rubens's 50th film.

Release
The film was released worldwide on 22 December 2017. It was later dubbed into Hindi under the title Taqdeer ( Destiny) and premiered on Star Gold on 23 June 2018. It was dubbed into Tamil with the same title and premiered in Star Vijay, and in Malayalam with the same title in 2019.

Box office 
The film grossed 26.4 crore worldwide in four days, with a distributors share of 14.38 crore. In Andhra Pradesh and Telangana, the four-day gross was 15.75 crore, with a share of 10.1 crore. Hello grossed  in its first week.

Legal issues 
An individual from Jharkhand claimed that the phone number used in the film as Junnu's number, which was shown through out the film, belonged to him and that he had been receiving several calls from fans. The makers of the film insisted that they attained due permission from the respective telecom company. However, the company denied the claims and said that no such permission was granted.

Accolades

65th Filmfare Awards South
 Won – Filmfare Award for Best Female Debut – South – Kalyani Priyadarshan
 Nominated – Filmfare Award for Best Music Director – Telugu – Anoop Rubens
 Nominated – Filmfare Award for Best Male Playback Singer – Telugu – Armaan Malik – "Hello"

7th South Indian International Movie Awards
 Won – SIIMA Award for Best Female Debut (Telugu) – Kalyani Priyadarshan
 Nominated – SIIMA Award for Best Male Playback Singer (Telugu) – Armaan Malik – "Hello"

References

External links 
 

2017 films
2010s Telugu-language films
Films directed by Vikram Kumar
Films scored by Anoop Rubens
Indian romantic action films
2010s romantic action films